Transition is the eighth album of composer Peter Michael Hamel, released in 1983 through Kuckuck Schallplatten.

Track listing

Personnel
Peter Michael Hamel – piano, pipe organ, PPG Wave, synthesizer
Wolf Huber – photography
Ulrich Kraus – production, engineering
Hermann Wernhard – design

References

1983 albums
Kuckuck Schallplatten albums
Peter Michael Hamel albums